Simone Gozzi (born 13 April 1986) is an Italian footballer who plays as a right-back.

Club career
Born in Reggio Emilia, Emilia–Romagna, Gozzi started his career at hometown club Reggiana. On 6 July 2007 he was signed by Serie B team Modena F.C. in co-ownership deal. He made 25 starts that season. On 23 June 2008 Modena bought the remain 50% registration rights. On 19 July 2011 he was signed by Serie A team Cagliari, on loan for €100,000, with an option to purchase half of the registration rights.

Gozzi only played twice and in summer 2012 returned to Modena for their training camp.

After the relegation of Modena in Lega Pro, leaves the club and signed a two-year contract with the Alessandria.

On 24 September 2019, he signed with Olbia.

On 25 September 2020, he joined Carpi. Gozzi left the club at the end of the season.

Career statistics

Club

References

External links
 Football.it Profile 

1986 births
Living people
Sportspeople from Reggio Emilia
Italian footballers
Association football fullbacks
Serie A players
Serie B players
Serie C players
Serie D players
A.C. Reggiana 1919 players
Modena F.C. players
Cagliari Calcio players
U.S. Alessandria Calcio 1912 players
F.C. Pro Vercelli 1892 players
Olbia Calcio 1905 players
A.C. Carpi players
Footballers from Emilia-Romagna